Lasse Johansson (born 2 April 1975) is a Swedish footballer, currently playing for Emmaboda IS. He played for Kalmar FF from 2001-2009.

References

1975 births
Living people
Swedish footballers
Kalmar FF players
GAIS players
Allsvenskan players
Swedish Social Democratic Party politicians
Association football midfielders